Benjamin Maier (born 19 April 1994) is an Austrian bobsledder.

Career
Maier competed at the 2014 Winter Olympics for Austria. He teamed with brakeman Markus Sammer in the two-man event, finishing 22nd, and with Sammer, Stefan Withalm, Angel Somov and Sebastian Heufler in the four-man event, finishing 21st.

As of February 2016, his best showing at the World Championships is a bronze medal in the 2013 team event. His best finish in an Olympic event is 5th in the 2016 four-man event.

Maier made his World Cup debut in January 2014. As of February 2016, his best finish is 2nd two times, in 2015–16 at St. Moritz and Schönau am Königssee.

Maier married Canadian skeleton athlete Elisabeth Vathje in 2018.

References

External links

1994 births
Living people
Olympic bobsledders of Austria
People from Hall in Tirol
Bobsledders at the 2014 Winter Olympics
Bobsledders at the 2018 Winter Olympics
Bobsledders at the 2022 Winter Olympics
Austrian male bobsledders
Bobsledders at the 2012 Winter Youth Olympics
Sportspeople from Tyrol (state)